
Gmina Przeworsk is a rural gmina (administrative district) in Przeworsk County, Subcarpathian Voivodeship, in south-eastern Poland. Its seat is the town of Przeworsk, although the town is not part of the territory of the gmina.

Villages
Gmina Przeworsk contains the villages and settlements of Chałupki, Gorliczyna, Gorliczyna-Szewnia, Grzęska, Gwizdaj, Mirocin, Nowosielce, Rozbórz, Studzian, Świętoniowa, Ujezna, Urzejowice and Wojciechówka.

Neighbouring gminas
Gmina Przeworsk is bordered by the town of Przeworsk and by the gminas of Białobrzegi, Gać, Jarosław, Kańczuga, Łańcut, Pawłosiów, Tryńcza and Zarzecze.

References

Polish official population figures 2006

Przeworsk
Przeworsk County